Nuovo Mondo is the third studio album by Australian rock band Mondo Rock, released in July 1982. It was released through WEA Records and reached number 7 on the Kent Music Report.

Track listing

Personnel
Mondo Rock:
Ross Wilson – vocals
Eric McCusker – guitar, backing vocals
James Black – keyboards, guitar, bass, backing vocals
Paul Christie – bass, backing vocals
John James Hackett – drums

Production team:
Producer, Engineer – Peter McIan 
Additional Engineers – Jim Barton, Jim Barbour
Remixed by – Peter McIan, Paul Ray

Charts

References 

Mondo Rock albums
1982 albums
RCA Records albums
Polydor Records albums
Warner Music Group albums